RK Proleter Zrenjanin is a Serbian handball club based in Zrenjanin. They compete in the Serbian Handball Super League.

History
The club was founded in 1949. They won their first Yugoslav Handball Championship title in the 1989–90 season. The club subsequently finished as runners-up in the 1990–91 European Cup, losing in the final to Barcelona 41–40 on aggregate. In the 1991–92 season, they would go on to win the last edition of the Yugoslav Handball Championship.

Honours
Yugoslav League
 1989–90, 1991–92

Sponsorship
During its history, the club has been known by a variety of names due to sponsorship reasons:
 Proleter Naftagas
 Proleter Agroživ (2011–2013)

Notable players
The list includes players who played for their respective national teams in any major international tournaments, such as the Olympic Games, World Championships and European Championships:

  Uroš Vilovski
  Šandor Hodik
  Slaviša Đukanović
  Uroš Elezović
  Momir Rnić Jr.
  Nikola Adžić
  Goran Arsenić
  Duško Grbić
  Nebojša Jokić
  Blažo Lisičić
  Dane Šijan
  Rastko Stefanović
  Jovica Elezović
  Momir Rnić Sr.
  Ermin Velić

Head coaches

  Ivan Grubački
  Slobodan Mišković
  Momir Rnić Sr.
  Slobodan Mišković
  Momir Rnić Sr.
  Dragiša Aleksić
  Vojislav Malešević
  Mirko Vasiljević
  Momir Rnić Sr.
  Branko Maljković
  Dragiša Aleksić
  Branislav Zeljković
  Darko Jevtić
  Nebojša Jokić
  Momir Rnić Sr.
  Vladimir Kovačević (2010–2011)
  Momir Rnić Sr. (2011–2012)
  Nebojša Jokić (2012–2013)
  Vladimir Kovačević (2013–2014)
  Milan Grubanov (2014–2015)
  Momir Rnić Sr. (2016–2017)
  Zoltan Ivanica (2018)
  Nebojša Jokić (2018–2019)
  Ljubomir Obradović (2019–2020)
  Momir Rnić Sr. (2020–present)

References

External links
 RK Proleter Zrenjanin – EHF competition record
 RK Proleter Zrenjanin at srbijasport.net 

Proleter Zrenjanin
Handball clubs established in 1949
1949 establishments in Yugoslavia
Sport in Zrenjanin